Fiorella was an Italian professional cycling team that existed from 1977 to 1978.

The team was selected to race in two editions of the Giro d'Italia, but did not achieve any stage wins.

Major wins
1977
 Overall Vuelta a Levante, Bernt Johansson
 Coppa Bernocchi, Carmelo Barone
1978
 Coppa Bernocchi, Giovanni Battaglin
 Giro dell'Emilia, Bernt Johansson
 Gran Premio Industria e Commercio di Prato, Bernt Johansson

References

Defunct cycling teams based in Italy
1977 establishments in Italy
1978 disestablishments in Italy
Cycling teams established in 1977
Cycling teams disestablished in 1978